Raëlism is a UFO religion established in France during the 1970s. It soon spread to Quebec and then on to other parts of the world. There have been various attempts to estimate the number of Raëlians at different points.

Estimates 

From 1980 to 1992, Raël and his movement became increasingly global. In 1980, Claude Raël's fifth Raëlian book Sensual Meditation was published and formal publication of the Raëlian Messages in the Japanese language began as part of the Raëlian mission to Japan. Two years later, Africa became another target area in the mission to spread the Raëlian messages.

References

Further reading
 Alexander, Brian, Rapture: A Raucous Tour of Cloning, Transhumanism, and the New Era of Immortality Basic Books, 2005. .
 Bates, Gary, Alien Intrusion: UFOs and the Evolution Connection New Leaf Press, 2005. .
 Colavito, Jason, The cult of alien gods: H.P. Lovecraft and extraterrestrial pop culture. Prometheus, 2005. . (Also see article on Wikipedia)
 Edwards, Linda, A Brief Guide to Beliefs: Ideas, Theologies, Mysteries, and Movements. Westminster John Knox Press, 2001. .
 Genta, Giancarlo, Lonely Minds in the Universe: The Search for Extraterrestrial Intelligence. Springer, 2007. .
 Lewis, James R., Controversial New Religions Oxford University Press, 2004. .
 Lewis, James R., The Gods have landed: new religions from other worlds State University of New York Press, 1995. .
 Palmer, Susan J., Aliens Adored. Rutgers University Press, 2004. .
 Palmer, Susan J., Women in Controversial New Religions, in New Religious Movements and Religious Liberty in America, ed. Derek H. Davis & Barry Hankins, p. 66. Baylor University Press, 2004. 
 Partridge, Christopher H. UFO Religions. Routledge, 2003. .
 Raël, Intelligent Design . Nova Distribution, 2005. 
 Raël, Geniocracy. The Raelian Foundation, 2004.
 Raël, Maitreya . The Raelian Foundation, 2003.
 Raël, Sensual Meditation . Tagman Press, 2002.
 Raël, Yes to Human Cloning: Immortality Thanks to Science. Tagman Press, 2001. ; .
 Shanks, Pete, Human genetic engineering:a guide for activists, skeptics, and the very perplexed Nation Books, 2005. .
 Stock, Gregory, Redesigning Humans: Choosing our Genes, Changing our Future. Houghton Mifflin Books, 2002. .
 Tandy, Charles, Doctor Tandy's First Guide to Life Extension and Transhumanity Universal-Publishers.com, 2001. .
 United States Congress, Medical science and bioethics: attack of the clones? Hearing before the Subcommittee on Criminal Justice, Drug Policy, and Human Resources of the Committee on Government Reform, House of Representatives, One Hundred Seventh Congress, second session, 15 May 2002. Washington: U.S. G.P.O., 2003. Government Documents. Y 4.G 74/7:B 52/7.

Raëlism